Nghê (chữ Hán: 猊) is a mythical animal in Vietnamese culture, a combination of kỳ lân (or lion) and dog, often used as a mascot in front of communal temples, temples, pagodas, shrines  in Vietnam. In the countryside of North Vietnam, in front of the village gate there is always a big stone Nghê to protect the whole village, in front of the communal temple gate there is a stone Nghê, and in front of each house there is usually a small stone dog sitting in front of the guard. To keep it for the homeowner, in the southern countryside in front of the house, the guide often places a statue of a dog ceramic.

Origin 
Nghê is the localized mascot of the Kỳ Lân created by the Vietnamese, different from the unicorn or the lion. Nghe is the incarnation of a dog, raised to the same level Four Holy Beasts (Long, Lân, Quy, and Phụng) and different from the Chinese guardian lion. Nghê is the indigenous Mascot of the Vietnamese people. Is a spiritual guardian animal, against evil spirits and demons. Buddhism has the image of "Buddha lion", which means the lion of the Buddha. Being Buddha nature, it reduces ferocious things, omits the element of beast, becomes the lion of Buddha country.

Vietnamese Nghê with Buddhist influences. Compared with the Thai and Lao guardian lionslions are close, but compared with the Chinese guardian lions it is different. Chinese guardian lion in the direction of beasts; Nghê has the element of animal spirit, there is sacredness. Nghê is not only present in the villages of the North but also in the imperial architecture in Huế. In front of the gate of Hiển Nhơn and in front of the Miếu Môn Thế Tổ Miếu in the Imperial City of Huế, there are two pairs of stone elves standing in adoration. Different from the image of the Nghê in the Red River Delta, the two pairs of Nghê in Huế have been "imperial palace-ized" with elaborate carvings, forming clusters of twisted feathers at the head, ears and tail, alternating. fire blades on 4 legs and spine.

In the past, it was called the "tịch tà", except for bad things. It is the embodiment of the dog, an animal close to Vietnamese life, Nghê wears a lamp in the late Đông Sơn bronzes. The level of appearance of the clam is increasingly dense. The thrones of the Nguyễn dynasty had a couple of Nghê under them. Nghê is a sacred lion. During the Nguyễn dynasty, two common forms, the thiết đình at Thái Hòa Palace still had the shape of a nghê. This confirmed the supreme position of nghê in society at that time. Due to many historical events, we no longer have a palace, but in the Nguyễn dynasty, the nghê had a high position and was a valuable symbol: loyalty, devotion, absolute loyalty, wisdom. It is placed in a position where it can be immediately examined, distinguished from evil, welcomed, rejoiced.

Artifacts 

Nghê-shaped antiques of Guimet Museum (Paris)
 The lampstand has an nghê statue, with the sign that it was made in 1637 in Bát Tràng.
 Nghê drawing disc, produced for the Middle East market and Muslim countries.
Nghê-shaped artifacts of Vietnam History Museum (Hanoi):
 The top has a cap, white and gray enamel cracks. Revival Lê dynasty, April of Vĩnh Hựu year 2 (1736). The top has a dome-shaped lid, the top is a statue of a nghê playing with jade, around the bagua, a flat edge of the mouth, a bulging body, 3 animal legs embossed with tigers, 2 dragon-shaped straps. Embossed with ribbons of flip-flops, T-verses, cardinal leaves and dragons in the clouds. Minh Văn engraved on the base. Vĩnh Hựu vạn niên chi nhị, tứ nguyệt nhật cung tác). Gray white stretch enamel.
 Nậm Wine, colorful enamel. Mạc – Revival Lê dynasty, 16th–17th centuries. Nậm has a cylindrical high neck, a standing mouth, a divided body with 6 floating petals shaped like petals, embossed with nghê and flowers, and a brown base border. Ivory and moss green enamel.
 Nghê statue, ivory white enamel and moss green. Revival Lê dynasty, 17th century. Statue of Nghê on a rectangular pedestal, sitting in adoration, 2 front legs propped up, 2 hind legs bent, head raised, neck wearing a string of floating music. Around the body and legs touch the clouds. Rectangular base carved with clouds, lotus flowers and anise. Ivory white and moss green enamel.
 The jar has a lid, glaze and blue. Nguyễn dynasty, Gia Long era (1802–1819). The dome-shaped lid with the top is a statue of a nghê playing with jade, drawing clouds around. The hat has a curved mouth edge, a short neck, bulging shoulders, a high body, and a wide base. Embossed shoulders with 4 lion heads in a circle. Draw the theme of landscapes, houses, trees, people wearing umbrellas, people rowing boats. Minh Văn writes in enamel on the bottom. "Gia Long Niên Chế" (Made in the Gia Long era).
 The jar has a lid, white and blue enamel. Nguyễn dynasty, Gia Long era (1802–1819). The cap has a crown in the shape of a jade playing with jade, drawing flowers and leaves of blue enamel. The jar has a flat rim, a short neck, bulging shoulders, and a concave bottom. On the shoulder are embossed 4 lion heads with rings. Around the body are painted lam tiêu – tượng, mã – liễu, tùng – lộc. Minh Văn wrote 4 letters. "Gia Long Niên tạo" (Made in the Gia Long era). Brown, white and blue enamel.
 The altar has a lid, enamel, and ivory. Revival Lê dynasty, 18th century. The altar has 2 parts, the mouth is oval, the lid is decorated with the nghê's knob, the leaf ribbon is flipped, mai – cúc – trúc – tùng, "vạn" character, hổ phù. Men stretch ivory.
 Nghê statue, made of clay. Lê – Nguyễn dynasties, 18th–19th centuries Nghê stands on a rectangular pedestal, around the body embossed with clouds. Brown red.
 Nghê statue, made of clay. Lê – Nguyễn dynasties, 18th–19th centuries. Elephant kneels on a rectangular pedestal, tail twisted, body embossed with clouds. Brown red.

See also 
Chinese guardian lions
Komainu
Chinthe
Kitsune
Nio
Xiezhi

External links 

 Con Nghê - Một biểu tượng tạo hình thuần Việt 
 Trần Hậu Yên Thế: Nghê thuần Việt đi suốt chiều dài lịch sử
 Nghê gốm thế kỷ XIII-XIV 

Vietnamese legendary creatures